The University of Richmond School of Law (Richmond Law) is the law school of the University of Richmond, a private liberal arts college in Richmond, Virginia. Richmond Law is ranked 52nd (tie) in the US by US News,  among the top five value law schools by the National Jurist, and one of the Princeton Review's 167 Best Law Schools of 2018.

With approximately 150 J.D. candidates per class year, the University of Richmond School of Law is accredited by  the American Bar Association. Richmond Law's Dean, Wendy Perdue, is also a former president of the Association of American Law Schools. Richmond Law is also approved by the Virginia State Board of Bar Examiners and is the most common alma mater of judges in the state.

History

The school was founded in 1870 as a college within the University of Richmond. In 1890, the family of the late T. C. Williams, a university trustee, donated $25,000 as the nucleus of an endowment for the law school. In recognition of this gift, the school was named The T. C. Williams School of Law in 1920.  In 2022, the school changed the official name from the "T. C. Williams School of Law" to the "University of Richmond School of Law" in keeping with its naming principle that prohibits the use of names of people who engaged in enslavement or openly advocated the enslavement of people.

In 1914, Richmond College (as the university was then known), including its law department, moved from its location downtown to the present campus.  Returning servicemen from World War I created space problems for the college and the law department had to be relocated to the old Columbia Building at Grace and Lombardy streets.  In 1920, the law department was reorganized as a separate School of Law within what was now the University of Richmond.

The current Law School building, constructed in the Collegiate Gothic architectural style, was originally opened in 1954, and it was enlarged in 1972 and 1981. In 1991, the building was significantly expanded, renovated, and refurbished. The Law School building now provides modern and technologically equipped classrooms, seminar rooms, a law library, a moot courtroom, faculty and administrative offices, faculty and student lounges, and offices for most student organizations.

The Richmond School of Law was ranked 52nd in the 2023 ranking of law schools by U.S. News & World Report. According to US News, the school has 440 students with a student-to-faculty ratio of 7.7:1.

Cost of attendance

The total cost of attendance (indicating the cost of tuition, fees, and living expenses) at Richmond Law for the 2020-21 academic year is $67,550. The Law School Transparency estimated debt-financed cost of attendance for three years, based on data from the 2020-21 academic year, is $202,650. For the 2018-2019 school year, 67% of entering students received scholarships. The 50th percentile grant amount of scholarships was $35,000.

Employment
According to Richmond School of Law's official 2018 ABA-required disclosures, 85% of the Class of 2018 obtained full-time, long-term, JD-required employment nine months after graduation. Richmond's Law School Transparency under-employment score is 11%, indicating the percentage of the Class of 2018 unemployed, pursuing an additional degree, or working in a non-professional, short-term, or part-time job nine months after graduation.

Initiatives
Richmond Law has recently launched several new initiatives focusing on expanding areas of the law such as intellectual property, wrongful convictions and family law. The school is making a strong push to become a center for intellectual property law, as evidenced by the recent founding of the Intellectual Property Institute (IPI) and the offering of a joint degree program with Virginia Tech that will enable students to earn both a Bachelor of Science degree and a law degree in as little as six years’ time. Through the IPI, Richmond law students are able to obtain a certificate of concentration in Intellectual Property Law.

The Institute for Actual Innocence, founded in 2005, works to identify and exonerate wrongfully convicted individuals in the Commonwealth of Virginia.  The Institute is an academic program that partners students with local attorneys and community leaders to seek post-conviction relief for wrongfully convicted prisoners in the Commonwealth of Virginia. Three days before leaving office, President Obama commuted Dujuan Farrow's life sentence after the Institute for Actual Innocence submitted his case for clemency review.

Publications

University of Richmond Law Review
The University of Richmond Law Review, founded in 1958, publishes four issues a year: the Annual Survey in November, the Symposium Issue in March, and two general issues in January and May. In addition, since 2015, the Law Review has published an online volume each year, and launched a podcast in 2020. Staff members are selected at the end of their first year of law school after participating in a journal competition, which takes into consideration students' grades and the results of a casenote and Bluebook exam.

Richmond Public Interest Law Review
The Richmond Public Interest Law Review (PILR) is a law review published by the University of Richmond School of Law. The journal, formerly known as the Richmond Journal of Law and the Public Interest, vol. 1 (1996) - vol. 19 (2016), focuses on issues pertaining to social welfare, public policy, and a broad spectrum of jurisprudence.

Publishing three annual volumes, PILR posts its articles and other related content online to reach the widest audience possible. Of these annual publications, two volumes specifically attempt to confront prominent and difficult issues raised by modern society: 
 The General Assembly in Review issue, an annual print volume focused exclusively on the legislative work of the Virginia General Assembly and its implications for the Commonwealth's citizens and future. Past topics have included discussions regarding state legislation aimed at reproductive rights, religious freedom, lyme disease, the reformation of ethics and conflict of interest laws, mental health court systems, and the sexual victimization of incarcerated juveniles; and
 The PILR Symposium issue, touching on contemporary social welfare issues and controversial topics relating to our nation's public interest. Past topics have confronted challenging issues in the areas of veteran's law, privacy rights and the regulation of sexuality, gender equality in the twenty-first century, and wrongful convictions.

Richmond Journal of Law and Technology
The Richmond Journal of Law and Technology (JOLT) is a law review published by the School of Law.  It was the first student-edited law review in the world to be published exclusively online.

First published on April 10, 1995, the journal focused on the impact of computer-related and other emerging technologies on the law. Today, JOLT publishes four issues per year containing a variety of technology-related articles including traditional intellectual property issues, telecommunication law, biotechnology, computer law, and emerging areas of constitutional law.

Notable faculty
 Ronald J. Bacigal – Specializes in Criminal Law and Procedure. He also serves as Reporter of Criminal Decisions for the Court of Appeals of Virginia
 Harry L. Carrico – Senior Justice, Supreme Court of Virginia; Visiting Professor of Law and Civic Engagement; Sixteenth Judicial Circuit Judge, 1956–1961
James Comey – former Director, Federal Bureau of Investigation; former Deputy Attorney General; former United States Attorney, 4th Circuit; former United States Attorney, 1st Circuit
Marla Decker – Chief Judge of the Virginia Court of Appeals; former Virginia Secretary of Public Safety
Tim Kaine – United States Senator, Virginia; former Governor of Virginia, 2005; former Lieutenant Governor of Virginia, 2001; former Mayor of Richmond, 1998
 Donald W. Lemons – Supreme Court of Virginia, Justice, 2000–present; Court of Appeals of Virginia, Judge, 1998-2000; Circuit Court for the City of Richmond, Judge, 1995–98; John Marshall Professor of Judicial Studies
 Harold G. Wren (1921-2016) – dean of three law schools

Notable alumni 

Watkins Abbitt – U.S. Representative from Virginia, 1948-1973 
Les Adams – Member, Virginia House of Delegates
Dave Albo – Former Member, Virginia House of Delegates
Ward Armstrong – Former Minority Leader, Virginia House of Delegates
Leon Bazile – Trial judge in the case of Loving v. Virginia
 José M. Cabanillas – Executive officer of the USS Texas, rear admiral, awarded the Bronze Star
Ben Chafin – Virginia State Senator
Teresa M. Chafin, Justice of the Supreme Court of Virginia
 Ben Cline – Congressman; Former Member of the Virginia House of Delegates
Mary Daniel – Judge for General District Court Judge for the 26th Judicial District of Virginia
Marla Decker – Chief Judge of the Court of Appeals of Virginia
 Jenna Ellis – Legal advisor for Donald Trump
Walter S. Felton, Jr. – Former Chief Judge of the Court of Appeals of Virginia
 Mark Herring – Former attorney general of Virginia, former member of the Senate of Virginia
 Lawrence L. Koontz, Jr. – Retired Justice of the Supreme Court of Virginia
Jay Leftwich – Member, Virginia House of Delegates
Lynwood Lewis – Virginia State Senator
 G. Manoli Loupassi – Former member, Virginia House of Delegates
 Stephen R. McCullough – Justice of the Supreme Court of Virginia
 Robert R. Merhige, Jr. – Former U.S. District Court Judge, Eastern District of Virginia
 Nathan H. Miller – Former Virginia State Senator
 Willis D. Miller – Former Justice of the Supreme Court of Virginia
Chris Peace – Former Member, Virginia House of Delegates
A. L. Philpott – Former Speaker of the Virginia House of Delegates
 Owen B. Pickett – U.S. Representative, 1987-2001
 Robert Nelson Pollard – Judge of the United States District Court for the Eastern District of Virginia
 A. Willis Robertson – U.S. Senator, 1946-1966
 Harvey E. Schlesinger – Senior U.S. District Judge, Middle District of Florida
 Harold Fleming Snead – Former Chief Justice of the Supreme Court of Virginia
 Frederick Pfarr Stamp Jr. – Judge of the United States District Court for the Northern District of West Virginia
Richard Stuart – Virginia State Senator
Tony Pham – Prosecutor and former Acting Director of U.S. Immigration and Customs Enforcement

References

External links
Richmond Law

Richmond, University of
Richmond, University of School of Law
1870 establishments in Virginia
Richmond